Myelin transcription factor 1 is a protein that in humans is encoded by the MYT1 gene.

Function 

The protein encoded by this gene is a member of a family of neural specific, zinc finger-containing DNA-binding proteins. The protein binds to the promoter regions of proteolipid proteins of the central nervous system and plays a role in the developing nervous system.

Interactive pathway map

Interactions 

MYT1 has been shown to interact with PIN1.

References

Further reading

External links 
 

Transcription factors